Carrajung is a town in eastern Victoria, Australia. Carrajung is situated between Yarram and Traralgon, about 5 kilometres from the Hyland Highway at a height of approximately 520 meters above sea level. Carrajung is situated close to the eastern end of the Grand Ridge Road.

It has a population of around 100 people. Carrajung has a football oval, one church,a community hall and a primary school that is now closed.
Carrajung Post Office opened on 1 November 1887 and closed in 1974. Carrajung Lower, nearby, had a Post Office open from 1902 until 1911, and from 1922 until 1969 although known as Bruthen Creek until 1926.

The name Carrajung is thought to have been derived from an Aboriginal word meaning a fishing line.

References

Towns in Victoria (Australia)
Shire of Wellington